Meteugoa melanoleuca is a moth of the family Erebidae. It was described by George Hampson in 1901. It is found on New Guinea.

References

 

Moths described in 1901
Lithosiini